The 2020 Cincinnati Bearcats football team represented the University of Cincinnati in the 2020 NCAA Division I FBS football season. The Bearcats played their home games at Nippert Stadium and competed as members of the American Athletic Conference. They were led by fourth-year head coach Luke Fickell.

Previous season 
In 2019, the Bearcats finished with a 11–3 (7–1 AAC) record, and won the Birmingham Bowl against Boston College. The 2019 season was the second straight 11-win season for the Bearcats, and fourth such season in program history.

Recruits

Incoming transfers

Preseason

Award watch lists
Listed in the order that they were released

AAC preseason media poll
The preseason Poll was released September 1

Schedule 
The Bearcats' 2020 schedule consisted of six home games and four away games. with the departure of UConn, the American eliminated divisions for the 2020 and 2021 seasons, the Bearcats 2020 schedule will include eight conference games – four home games and four road games. Cincinnati hosted East Carolina, Houston, Memphis, and South Florida. They will travel to UCF, SMU, Temple, and Tulsa.

The Bearcats' hosted their opening non-conference game against Austin Peay (FCS). Cincinnati had a sixth home game against Western Michigan and two away games scheduled against Nebraska and Miami (OH), which were canceled due to the COVID-19 pandemic. This was the first season since 1944 that the Bearcats did not play Miami (OH) in the battle for the Victory Bell. To replace the canceled games, Cincinnati added a series against Army with a return game at Army scheduled for 2031.

The game between Tulsa and Cincinnati was originally scheduled to take place on October 17, however, due to COVID-19 management requirements in response to positive tests and subsequent quarantine of individuals within the Cincinnati program, the game was eventually rescheduled for December 12.

A COVID-19 outbreak within the Cincinnati program lead to the cancellation of the game between Temple and Cincinnati, scheduled for November 28, and the rescheduled game between Tulsa and Cincinnati, scheduled for December 12. In lieu of a head-to-head result against Tulsa, Cincinnati was granted hosting rights for the American Championship based upon conference tiebreakers.

Schedule Source:

Game summaries

Austin Peay

See Also: Austin Peay at Cincinnati Box Score

Army

See Also: Army at Cincinnati Box Score

South Florida

See Also: South Florida at Cincinnati Box Score

at SMU

See Also: Cincinnati at SMU Box Score

Memphis

See Also: Memphis at Cincinnati Box Score

Houston

See Also: Houston at Cincinnati Box Score

East Carolina

See Also: East Carolina at Cincinnati Box Score

at UCF

See Also: Cincinnati at UCF Box Score

Tulsa (AAC Championship Game)

See Also: Tulsa at Cincinnati Box Score

Georgia (Peach Bowl)

See Also:Georgia vs. Cincinnati Box Score

Source for Match-up Records:

Personnel

Roster and staff

Depth chart

Rankings

Awards and milestones

Players drafted into the NFL

References

Cincinnati
Cincinnati Bearcats football seasons
American Athletic Conference football champion seasons
Cincinnati Bearcats football